SmartFusion is a family of microcontrollers with an integrated FPGA of Actel. The device includes an ARM Cortex-M3 hard processor core (with up to 512kB of flash and 64kB of RAM) and analog peripherals such as a multi-channel ADC and DACs in addition to their flash-based FPGA fabric.

Models

Development Hardware 
Actel also sells two development boards that include an SmartFusion chip. One is the SmartFusion Evaluation Kit which is a low cost board with an SmartFusion A2F200 and sold for $99. Another is the SmartFusion Development Kit which is a fully featured board with an SmartFusion A2F500 and is sold for $999
.

Development tools

Documentation
The amount of documentation for all ARM chips is daunting, especially for newcomers.  The documentation for microcontrollers from past decades would easily be inclusive in a single document, but as chips have evolved so has the documentation grown.  The total documentation is especially hard to grasp for all ARM chips since it consists of documents from the IC manufacturer (Actel) and documents from CPU core vendor (ARM Holdings).

A typical top-down documentation tree is: manufacturer website, manufacturer marketing slides, manufacturer datasheet for the exact physical chip, manufacturer detailed reference manual that describes common peripherals and aspects of a physical chip family, ARM core generic user guide, ARM core technical reference manual, ARM architecture reference manual that describes the instruction set(s).

SmartFusion documentation tree (top to bottom)
 SmartFusion website.
 SmartFusion marketing slides.
 SmartFusion datasheets.
 SmartFusion reference manuals.
 ARM core website.
 ARM core generic user guide.
 ARM core technical reference manual.
 ARM architecture reference manual.

Actel has additional documents, such as: evaluation board user manuals, application notes, getting started guides, software library documents, errata, and more.  See External Links section for links to official STM32 and ARM documents.

See also

 ARM architecture, List of ARM microprocessor cores, ARM Cortex-M
 Microcontroller, List of common microcontrollers
 Embedded system, Single-board microcontroller
 FPGA

References

Further reading

External links
SmartFusion Official Documents
 

ARM Official Documents

Other
 Running eCos on SmartFusion evaluation kit

ARM-based microcontrollers
Gate arrays